Cora Sternberg (born 1951) is an American medical oncologist at Weill Cornell Medicine and NewYork-Presbyterian Hospital, serving as a member of the Genitourinary (GU) Oncology Program. Dr. Sternberg facilitates the continued growth and development of clinical and translational research programs in GU malignancies, with a particular emphasis on expanding the overall research portfolio. As Clinical Director of the Englander Institute for Precision Medicine (EIPM), Dr. Sternberg will develop strategies to incorporate genomic sequencing and precision medicine throughout the Weill Cornell Medicine and NewYork-Presbyterian healthcare network, including Lower Manhattan, Brooklyn and Queens.

Dr. Sternberg previously served as chief of the medical oncology department at San Camillo-Forlanini Hospital in Rome, Italy, and adjunct professor at Sapienza University of Rome. Sternberg is an elected board member of the European Organisation for Research and Treatment of Cancer (EORTC).

She has been awarded the title ‘Grande Ufficiale al Merito della Repubblica Italiana’ and has received the Premio Minerva for Scientific Achievement, XVIII Edition for Achievements in Science. Sternberg has received the Premio ROSA “Risultati Ottenuti Senza Aiuti", award for special achievement from the Canova Club in 2011.

Biography 

Born in Philadelphia, Sternberg earned her undergraduate degree at the College of Women at the University of Pennsylvania and her medical degree at the University of Pennsylvania in Philadelphia. She also obtained a second medical degree at the University of Rome La Sapienza.

Upon transferring to Italy, Sternberg became a Consultant Physician at the Regina Elena Cancer Institute for Cancer Research, 1st Division of Medical Oncology in Rome, Italy. She then went on to become a Consultant Oncologist at the C.T.O. Hospital in Rome, Italy and subsequently Chief of the Department of Medical Oncology at the San Raffaele Scientific Institute in Rome, Italy and Consultant in Medical Oncology at the Regional General Hospital F. Miulli in Acquaviva delle Fonti, in Bari, Italy. From Fall 2002 - 2018 she was the Chief of the Department of Medical Oncology at the San Camillo-Forlanini Hospital in Rome, Italy.

Honors and awards 

 Order of Merit of the Italian Republic

Works

 Co-editor: Vito Pansadoro and Cora N. Sternberg. Il Carcinoma Infiltrante della Vescica. Accademia Nazionale di Medicina: Forum per la Formazione Biomedica. Sezione Urologia. Rome, 1994.
 Co-editor: Seth Lerner, Mark Schoenberg and Cora N. Sternberg. Comprehensive Textbook on Bladder Cancer. Taylor and Frances.Abington Oxon OX14 4 RN, England, 2006 
 Co-editor: Hein van Poppel, J.J.M.C.H. Delarosette and Cora N. Sternberg. Textbook on Renal Cell Cancer: Diagnosis and Therapy. Springer Verlag London, 2008
 Co-editor: Seth Lerner, Mark Schoenberg and Cora N. Sternberg. Textbook on Treatment Management of Bladder Cancer. Informa UK Ltd, 2008

See also 

Renal cell carcinoma

References 

Living people
American oncologists
Women oncologists
Scientists from Philadelphia
Academic staff of the Sapienza University of Rome
1951 births